Hypocrita rhaetia is a moth of the family Erebidae. It was described by Herbert Druce in 1895. It can be found in Bolivia.

References

 

Hypocrita
Moths described in 1895